Dennis Stokoe (6 June 1925 – 4 August 2005) was an English professional footballer who played as a wing half.

Career
Born in Blyth, Stokoe played for North Shields, Chesterfield, Carlisle United, Workington, Gateshead and Horden Colliery Welfare.

Later life and death
Stokoe worked as the chief business reporter on the Newcastle Journal between 1969 and 1990; he died on 4 August 2005.

References

1925 births
2005 deaths
English footballers
North Shields F.C. players
Chesterfield F.C. players
Carlisle United F.C. players
Workington A.F.C. players
Gateshead F.C. players
Darlington Town F.C. players
English Football League players
Association football wing halves